Canoe Landing Prairie is a Wisconsin Department of Natural Resources-designated State Natural Area featuring a diverse Hill's oak barrens and prairie community growing on the gently rolling, sandy uplands near the Eau Claire River. Plant composition includes the following species: Big bluestem, side-oats grama, butterfly weed, blue toadflax, and birdsfoot violet. Wild lupine is also found in the prairie, and supports a population of the karner blue butterfly, an endangered species whose caterpillars feed solely on wild lupine.

Location and access 
Access is via Canoe Landing Forest Road, which bisects the area from north-east to south-west.

References

External links 
Canoe Landing Prairie State Natural Area
Eau Claire County Parks & Forest
Google Map of Canoe Landing Prairie

Protected areas established in 2006
Protected areas of Eau Claire County, Wisconsin
State Natural Areas of Wisconsin
2006 establishments in Wisconsin